Thorowgood Smith (1744 in Accomac County, Virginia – August 13, 1810) was the second mayor of Baltimore from 1804 to 1808. He was appointed to that position when his predecessor James Calhoun resigned. He served for 4 years. He reformed the police system, and ordered the building the plumbing system by the Baltimore water company. Smith was well respected throughout the region. He died in 1810.

References

1744 births
1810 deaths
Mayors of Baltimore